Venoge Farmstead, also known as Musee de Venoge, is a historic home and farm located in Craig Township, Switzerland County, Indiana. The house was built in 1828, and is a -story, rectangular frame cottage in a vernacular French Colonial style.  It has a side gable roof and measures 18 feet by 38 feet, including an integral front porch.

It was listed on the National Register of Historic Places in 1997.

References

Houses on the National Register of Historic Places in Indiana
Houses completed in 1805
Buildings and structures in Switzerland County, Indiana
National Register of Historic Places in Switzerland County, Indiana